Lecithocera fuscedinella is a moth in the family Lecithoceridae. It was described by Snellen in 1901. It is found on Java.

The wingspan is about 18 mm. The forewings are greyish-brown forewings without markings.

References

Moths described in 1901
fuscedinella
Moths of Indonesia